The French Women's Elite Championship or in (French : Championnat de France d'Élite féminine ) (DEF) is the second women's division in French volleyball, it was created in 2010 between the Ligue A and the Nationale 1. At the end of the 2012/2013 season, the division merged with the National 1 to form the Women's Elite Championship.

Last Played Season
In the 2018–19 season 20 teams has participated, of whom 3 teams promoted to the French Women's Volleyball League and 3 other teams was relegated to the French women's volleyball Third Division.

Winners list

References

External links
 Ligue Nationale de Volley
 French Élite women.volleybox.net 

France women's 2nd League
Volleyball in France
French Women's 2 Volleyball League
Sports leagues established in 2010
2010 establishments in France
Sports leagues in France